The 2020 South Alabama Jaguars softball team represented the University of South Alabama in the 2020 NCAA Division I softball season. The Jaguars played their home games at Jaguar Field. The Jaguars were led by fourteenth year head coach Becky Clark and were members of the Sun Belt Conference.

On March 12, the Sun Belt Conference announced the indefinite suspension of all spring athletics, including softball, due to the increasing risk of the COVID-19 pandemic.  On March 16, the Sun Belt formally announced the cancelation of all spring sports, thus ending their season definitely.

Preseason

Sun Belt Conference Coaches Poll
The Sun Belt Conference Coaches Poll was released on January 29, 2020. South Alabama was picked to finish eighth in the Sun Belt Conference with 31 votes.

Preseason All-Sun Belt team
Summer Ellyson (LA, SR, Pitcher)
Megan Kleist (LA, SR, Pitcher)
Julie Rawls (LA, SR, Catcher)
Reagan Wright (UTA, SR, Catcher)
Katie Webb (TROY, SR, 1st Base)
Kaitlyn Alderink (LA, SR, 2nd Base)
Hailey Mackay (TXST, SR, 3rd Base)
Alissa Dalton (LA, SR, Shortstop)
Jayden Mount (ULM, SR, Shortstop)
Whitney Walton (UTA, SR, Shortstop)
Tara Oltmann (TXST, JR, Shortstop)
Courtney Dean (CCU, JR, Outfield)
Mekhia Freeman (GASO, SR, Outfield)
Sarah Hudek (LA, SR, Outfield)
Raina O'Neal (LA, JR, Outfield)
Bailey Curry (LA, JR, Designated Player/1st Base)

National Softball Signing Day

Roster

{| class="toccolours" style="text-align: left; font-size:90%;"
|-
! colspan="9" style="; text-align:center;"| 2020 South Alabama Jaguars roster
|-
|width="03"| 
|valign="top"|
Pitchers
1 Kelsie Rivers - ''Sophomore4 Allie Hughen - Junior
16 Lexi Hutchins - Freshman
33 Jamie Finnical - Junior
35 Jenna Hardy - FreshmanOutfielders2 MC Nichols - Senior
12 Shelby Sloan - Freshman
18 Mackenzie Brasher - Freshman
24 Amanda Flynn - Junior
34 Victoria Ortiz - Sophomore

|width="15"| 
|valign="top"|Catchers3 Emma Kropp - Freshman
10 Kassidy Wilcox - Freshman
11 Kamdyn Kvistad - JuniorInfielders5 Camryn McLemore - Freshman
7 Caroline Nichols - Sophomore
9 Jordyn Calderon - Sophomore
17 Abby Krzywiecki - Senior
19 Kennedy Cronan - Sophomore
20 Holly Stewart - Sophomore
22 Breanna Barlow - Freshman
30 Katelyn Gruich - Senior

|}

Coaching staff

Schedule and resultsSchedule Source:'''
*Rankings are based on the team's current ranking in the NFCA/USA Softball poll.

References

South Alabama
South Alabama Jaguars softball
South Alabama Jaguars softball seasons